Hal Yates (July 26, 1899 – August 1, 1969) was an American screenwriter and film director. He wrote for 96 films between 1924 and 1953.  He also directed 88 films between 1926 and 1953.

He started his career in entertainment in a vaudeville double-act called 'Yates and Lawley'. Yates first worked at the Hal Roach Studios where he directed a few early Laurel and Hardy comedies (including the lost Hats Off),and later worked at the RKO studios directing short films featuring Edgar Kennedy and Leon Errol.

He was born in Chicago, Illinois, and died in Los Angeles, California.

Selected filmography
 Hats Off (1927)
 Get 'Em Young (1926)
 The Nickel-Hopper (1926)
 Along Came Auntie (1926)
 Thundering Fleas (1926)
 Wife Tamers (1926)
 Say It with Babies (1926)
 Madame Mystery (1926)
 Wandering Papas (1926)
 What's the World Coming To? (1926)
 Nobody's Baby (1937)

External links

 

1899 births
1969 deaths
American film directors
American male screenwriters
Vaudeville performers
20th-century American male writers
20th-century American screenwriters